Mt. Baw Baw Alpine Resort is a small Australian downhill ski resort located approximately  east of Melbourne and  north of the Latrobe Valley in Victoria. The Alpine Resort is an unincorporated area which is surrounded by the Baw Baw National Park and the Australian Alps Walking Track passes nearby. The summit of Mount Baw Baw (1567m) falls within the boundaries of the resort and is accessible by lift or walking trail. The resort is also a base for cross-country skiing on the Baw-Baw Plateau.

The resort is the closest downhill ski resort to Melbourne and takes 2.5 hours to reach. Road access to the resort is via the Mount Baw Baw Tourist Road (from the west) or the unsealed South Face Road (from the east). 

In 2018, Mt. Baw Baw is set to become the second ski resort in Australia to operate a TechnoAlpin Snow Factory capable of producing snow in any outdoor temperature.

Ski runs
The Mt Baw Baw alpine resort has 7 surface lifts which provide access to its 15 ski runs and toboggan areas: Maltese Cross T-Bar, Summit T-Bar, Big Hill Poma, Painted Run T-Bar, Tank Hill Platter, Hut Run Platter and the Magic Carpet. The resort categorises 25% of runs as beginner, 64% intermediate and 11% advanced. Mt Baw Baw is considered an ideal resort for novice downhill skiers and boarders and for families. The resort also provides access to over 10 km of groomed cross country ski trails.

Climate
The Mt. Baw Baw Summit receives more annual precipitation than most places in mainland Australia and frequent snow in winter. Frequent heavy cloud cover means the mountain is often shrouded in low cloud or mist. Summers are cool and temperatures rarely rise above . During the 2009 Victorian heatwave most of the state saw highs of above , while the temperature on Mount Baw Baw's summit reached a comparatively cool maximum of just .

Ownership and operation
The resort is operated by the Southern Alpine Resort Management Board who are also responsible for management of the Lake Mountain Alpine Resort.

See also

Skiing in Australia
Mount Baw Baw
Australian Alps Walking Track
Lake Mountain (Victoria)
Baw baw frog, A critically endangered frog, which lives on the Baw Baw Plateau.

References

External links

Mount Baw Baw Ski Resort website
Information about packages and deals at the resort
Information about accessing the resort
Mt. Baw Baw Weather
Live Cameras
Snow Reports

Ski areas and resorts in Victoria (Australia)